Paulette le Raer (7 January 1932 – 28 January 1989) was a French gymnast. She competed in six events at the 1960 Summer Olympics.

References

External links
 

1932 births
1989 deaths
French female artistic gymnasts
Olympic gymnasts of France
Gymnasts at the 1960 Summer Olympics
Sportspeople from Saint-Malo
20th-century French women